Wye River is a minor river in the northeast of the South Island of New Zealand. It feeds into the Wairau River.

A single lane Truss Bridge carries traffic on State Highway 63 over the river.

References

Rivers of the Marlborough Region
Rivers of New Zealand